The 1998 United States Senate election in Pennsylvania was held November 3, 1998. Incumbent Republican U.S. Senator Arlen Specter won re-election to a fourth term.

General election

Candidates
Jack Iannantuono (Libertarian)
 William R. Lloyd Jr., State Representative (from Somerset County)
Dean Snyder (Constitution)
 Arlen Specter, incumbent U.S. Senator (from Philadelphia)

Campaign
Leading up to this campaign, the state Democratic Party was in dire straits, as it was plagued by prior corruption allegations of several key legislators and by a lack of fund-raising. Just as in the accompanying gubernatorial race, the party had difficulty in finding a credible candidate. State Representative Bill Lloyd, who was a well-respected party leader but who had little statewide name recognition, was considered by Democratic party leaders to be a sacrificial lamb candidate. Specter ran a straightforward campaign and attempted to avoid mistakes, while Lloyd's bid was so underfunded that he was unable to air a single commercial until two weeks before the election. Lloyd's strategy was to portray Republicans as hyper-partisan in wake of their attempt to impeach President Bill Clinton, but he was unable to gain any traction with his message. On Election Day, Specter's win was by the second-largest margin in the history of Senate elections in Pennsylvania. Lloyd won only two counties: almost uniformly Democratic Philadelphia and his home county, rural and typically Republican Somerset County.  As of 2022, this is the last time Allegheny County voted for a Republican Senate candidate.

Results

See also 
 1998 United States Senate elections

References 

United States Senate
Pennsylvania
1998